Megachile subalbuta is a species of bee in the family Megachilidae. It was described by Yasumatsu in 1936.

References

Subalbuta
Insects described in 1936